"Keeping Score" is a song recorded by Australian record producer L D R U, featuring Paige IV and was released in September 2015 as the lead single from L D R U's debut studio album Sizzlar (2017).

In January 2016, the song was voted number 22 in the Triple J Hottest 100, 2015 and following this result, peaked at number 14 on the ARIA Singles Chart in February 2016. The song was certified double platinum in Australia in 2017.

At the ARIA Music Awards of 2016, the song was nominated for Best Dance Release, Breakthrough Artist and Song of the Year.

Track listing
Digital download
 "Keeping Score" – 3:02

Digital download
 "Keeping Score" (Cut Snake remix)– 5:34
 "Keeping Score" (Luca Lush remix)– 3:31
 "Keeping Score" (Boxinbox & Lionsize remix)– 2:57
 "Keeping Score" (The Meeting Tree remix)– 2:32
 "Keeping Score" (Terace remix)– 5:18
 "Keeping Score" (Oski remix)– 3:43

Charts

Weekly charts

Year-end charts

Certification

References

2015 songs
2015 singles
L D R U songs
Australian pop songs
Songs written by Sarah Aarons